Audley is a locality on the outskirts of southern Sydney, in the state of New South Wales, Australia. It is located in the Royal National Park and is part of the Sutherland Shire.

Geography

Kangaroo Creek joins the Hacking River at Audley. A causeway crosses the river here, which is subject to flooding and occasional road closure for travellers into the Royal National Park, and communities at Bundeena/Maianbar.  Audley features extensive picnic areas, boat hire facilities, a bike track and a visitor's centre. Audley is also the location of the administrative headquarters for the Royal National Park.

History
The area was surveyed by Lord George Edward Audley in 1863–64, where he set up camp. He later married Emily, second daughter of Major Sir Thomas Mitchell, the Surveyor-General.

Floodgates were constructed in Audley in 1900. Audley developed into a small village of amusements, surrounded by 'pleasure gardens'. It was popular with holiday-makers and honeymooners who could stay at the Allambie House guesthouse. A dance hall was built here in the 1940s, which still stands today.

Heritage listings
Audley has a number of heritage-listed sites, including:
 Sir Bertram Stevens & Audley Road: Audley historic recreational complex

Gallery

References

 
Sydney localities
Sutherland Shire